Lane City is an unincorporated community in Wharton County, Texas, United States. The community is situated at the intersection of Texas State Highway 60 and Farm to Market Road 442.

Demographics
According to the Handbook of Texas, the community had an estimated population of 111 in 2000.

Lane City has a post office with the ZIP code 77453.

Education
Public education in the community of Lane City is provided by the Wharton Independent School District.

References

External links
 

Unincorporated communities in Wharton County, Texas
Unincorporated communities in Texas